Sir Alfred Townsend Bucknill, OBE, PC (19 December 1880 – 22 December 1963), was an English judge and a Privy Councillor. Specialising in maritime law, he presided over a number of boards of enquiry into naval events during the Second World War.

Early life
Alfred was born in Epsom, the son of Thomas Townsend Bucknill, a judge and Member of Parliament, and Annie Bell (née Ford). He was educated at Charterhouse School and Trinity College, Oxford and was called to the Bar in 1903. During the First World War, he was an officer in the Surrey Yeomanry and served in France and Egypt, later serving as a staff officer in Ireland. Alfred became a judge and was knighted in 1935, specialising in probate and shipping.

Boards of enquiry
In June 1939, he was appointed the president of the board of enquiry into the loss of the new submarine HMS Thetis, which sank during trials with the loss of 99 lives. Sir Alfred presided over further boards; for the sinking of the battlecruiser HMS Repulse and the battleship HMS Prince of Wales by Japanese aircraft off Malaya in December 1941, and for the "Channel Dash" in February 1942 when three large German warships had traversed the English Channel almost unscathed,

Family life
Alfred married Brenda Boulnois (1879–1953) in 1905. They had two children at their home in Chelsea, London; Margaret, born 1908 and Peter Thomas, born 1910.

References

1880 births
1963 deaths
People from Epsom
Probate, Divorce and Admiralty Division judges
People educated at Charterhouse School
Members of the Privy Council of the United Kingdom
Surrey Yeomanry officers
Lords Justices of Appeal
Knights Bachelor